Political hypocrisy or hypocrisy in policy refers to any discrepancy between what a political party claims and the practices the party is trying to hide. Modern political debate is often characterized by accusations and counter-accusations of hypocrisy.

The English philosopher Thomas Hobbes was an outspoken opponent of political hypocrisy, though he considered it inevitable. David Runciman writes that "Hobbes was at pains not to set the bar for sincerity too high, which would let in the most corrosive forms of hypocrisy through the back door. But he also believed that some forms of hypocrisy, unchecked, would render political life impossible".
The author Bernard Mandeville goes further, distinguishing two types of hypocrisy: one in which politicians wear a mask of hypocrisy to protect public interests, and the other more sinister hypocrisy to serve the interests of malicious politicians. The distinction between the two, as Mandeville seeks to demonstrate, is difficult to maintain in any political setting.
The philosopher Jean-Jacques Rousseau devoted much of his writing to creating portraits of innocence, virtue, and integrity as counterpoints to his scathing critique of the corruption, flattery, and hypocrisy that afflicted the social and political life in his view. For the British philosopher Jeremy Bentham, the mask of hypocrisy is intended to conceal or deceive and must always be removed.
Similarly, in his book On Compromise (dubbed "The Prince for Victorian liberalism" by his biographer), the British politician John Morley expresses his concerns about the triumph of the political spirit, which he defines as the abandonment of principles and the willingness of politicians of all stripes to dissimulate and compromise in the name of the party.  In contrast, the English philosopher Francis Bacon, believed that wisdom is striking the correct balance between honesty and deception, so that one's reputation for honesty and their ability to deceive are both preserved.

Definition
The notion of hypocrisy has its origins in the theater. The Greek word meant 'acting' and the first 'hypocrites' were classical theater actors. As a result, the phrase was first used to describe the theatrical function of appearing to be someone else. As an attempt to separate one's personal behavior from the standards that apply to everyone else, hypocrisy in its pejorative connotation always implies some form of deception. American political journalist Michael Gerson says that political hypocrisy is "the conscious use of a mask to fool the public and gain political benefit".

Historical views
The English philosopher Thomas Hobbes was an outspoken opponent of political hypocrisy, though he considered it inevitable. David Runciman writes that "Hobbes was at pains not to set the bar for sincerity too high, which would let in the most corrosive forms of hypocrisy through the back door. But he also believed that some forms of hypocrisy, unchecked, would render political life impossible".
The author Bernard Mandeville goes further, distinguishing two types of hypocrisy: one in which politicians wear a mask of hypocrisy to protect public interests, and the other more sinister hypocrisy to serve the interests of malicious politicians. The distinction between the two, as Mandeville seeks to demonstrate, is difficult to maintain in any political setting.
The philosopher Jean-Jacques Rousseau devoted much of his writing to creating portraits of innocence, virtue, and integrity as counterpoints to his scathing critique of the corruption, flattery, and hypocrisy that afflicted the social and political life in his view. For the British philosopher Jeremy Bentham, the mask of hypocrisy is intended to conceal or deceive and must always be removed.
Similarly, in his book On Compromise (dubbed "The Prince for Victorian liberalism" by his biographer), the British politician John Morley expresses his concerns about the triumph of the political spirit, which he defines as the abandonment of principles and the willingness of politicians of all stripes to dissimulate and compromise in the name of the party.  In contrast, the English philosopher Francis Bacon, believed that wisdom is striking the correct balance between honesty and deception, so that one's reputation for honesty and their ability to deceive are both preserved.

Hypocrisy in democratic politics
In democratic politics, according to Dhruba Ghosh, the need for hypocrisy arises from the structure of political interactions.
David Runciman suggests that hypocrisy is common in politics and particularly unavoidable in liberal democratic democracies: "No one likes it, but everyone is at it."
In her book Ordinary Vices (1984), Judith Shklar downplays hypocrisy, ranking it as an unimportant vice based on its damage to liberal communities in comparison with, for instance, cruelty.
Nevertheless, because hypocrisy is despised and commonplace, Shklar writes that democratic politicians are often tempted to reveal their opponents' double standards: it is easier to dispose of an opponent's character by exposing his hypocrisy than to challenge his political convictions.
Shklar believes that we should be more accepting of hypocrisy and realize that liberal democratic politics can only be sustained with a certain amount of deception and pretense.

Examples
According to the Middle East Monitor, campaigns to ban Israel from international sporting events have yielded few results. Palestinians have been repeatedly informed by FIFA, the international governing body of association football, that "sport and politics don't mix." Nevertheless, FIFA and similar agencies, such as UEFA and IOC, have joined the West's anti-Russian sanctions in the aftermath of Russia's invasion of Ukraine in 2022. In contrast, Fethi Nourine, an Algerian judoka, was suspended for ten years, along with his instructor, for withdrawing from the 2020 Tokyo Olympics to avoid an Israeli opponent. Other athletes and teams have been fined for showing symbolic sympathy for Palestine, and even fans have been punished for just holding Palestinian flags or chanting for Palestinian freedom. The disparity in the treatment of Syrian and Ukrainian refugees in Europe has been considered an instance of political hypocrisy.

Case study: United States 
John Mearsheimer suggests that the U.S. foreign policy rhetorics of high liberal ideas does not match its actions. Such a chasm, according to Eugenio Lilli, has fueled accusations of U.S. hypocrisy and harmed the U.S. image in Muslim communities, providing fertile ground for extremist organizations to recruit people willing to carry out terrorist attacks against U.S. citizens and assets. 
In particular, the constant support for Israel is said to have harmed the U.S. image in the Greater Middle East. As another example, the U.S. official policy of promoting democratic values contradicts the U.S. warm relations with monarchies and dictatorships in the Middle East. While claiming to be a proponent of the human rights, the U.S. has also turned a blind eye to alleged violations of human rights in countries like South Korea, the Philippines, and Iran's Pahlavi dynasty, which consistently abused human rights.
In another instance, the charges against Iran for its nuclear programme have not been met with any U.S. criticism of Israel which possesses more than two-hundred nuclear warheads.

Human rights 
The U.S. has been accused of scant ratification of human rights treaties despite its official policy of promoting human rights worldwide. In one case, the U.S. has been criticized for refusing to ratify the Convention on the Rights of the Child and the American opposition to this convention is said to be primarily shaped by political and religious conservatives., The U.S. has publicly stated that it is opposed to torture, but has been criticized for condoning it in the School of the Americas. The U.S. has advocated a respect for national sovereignty but has supported internal guerrilla movements and paramilitary organizations, such as the Contras in Nicaragua. 
The U.S. has also been accused of denouncing alleged rights violations in China while overlooking alleged human rights abuses by Israel. The Defense Technical Information Center reports that the U.S. did not pursue its human rights policy in South Korea, the Philippines, and Iran's Pahlavi dynasty, for strategic reasons, exposing the hypocrisy of "human rights diplomacy."
According to the U.S. House Committee on Foreign Affairs, trust is the fundamental problem of the U.S. in the Arab and non-Arab Muslim world. Arabs and the rest of the Muslim world, according to this report, have simply spent too much time listening to U.S. rhetoric and then watching the U.S. continually fail to deliver on it. A number of authors have attacked the U.S. attitude towards human rights: Ahmed an-Naim sees the U.S. monitoring of the international human rights as a pretext for its coercive humanitarian intervention in pursuit of its own foreign policy goals. Francis Boyle writes that genocide is perceived legal today when carried out at the request of the U.S. and its allies, such as Israel. According to Boyle, the U.S. government promoted the man responsible for blowing up an Iranian civilian airliner but wrongly sanctioned Libya when a U.S. airliner was attacked.
When former US Secretary of State, Rex Tillerson, took office, his department outlined general guidelines to be followed “We should consider human rights as an important issue in regard to US relations with China, Russia, North Korea and Iran,” read the leaked memo, sent to Tillerson to guide his policy actions, suggesting that human rights is a tool that can only be used against enemies, not friends.

Democracy 
The U.S. foreign policy language extols its worldwide support for the cause of democracy, though Eugenio Lilli suggests that this rhetoric does not match the conduct of U.S., particularly in the Greater Middle East.
In an article called Astounding Hypocrisy, Arab News writes that Palestinians voted for Hamas in defiance of Israel but the administration of George W. Bush made it clear that the U.S. would not accept the outcome of the free election. In the same speech, however, Bush expressed his hopes for a democratic Iran and a pro-American government there. During the 2003 invasion of Iraq, Muslim communities largely believed that promoting democracy was used as a pretext by the Bush administration to justify the invasion. Before the 2003 invasion of Iraq, the search for restricted weapons, the United States claimed, was the first priority for the country; though Bush later openly proclaimed regime change as the objective. The invasion was codenamed "the battle for Iraqi freedom," and American propagandists, according to Mack H Jones, flooded their messaging with homilies about the U.S. desire and intention to liberate the Iraqi people and offer them western-style democracy. The Bush administration's ostensible desire to provide democracy and freedom to the Iraqi people, while continuing to align itself with several repressive nondemocratic regimes around the world including some Middle Eastern client states, is yet another example of American duplicity, according to Jones.

Weapons of mass destruction 
Al Raya writes that the U.S. attack on Iran over its nuclear program is not met with any Western opposition to Israel and its alleged arsenal of more than 200 nuclear warheads. Sokolski and Gilinsky see this as inconsistent with the U.S. nonproliferation policy, adding that every U.S. president since Bill Clinton has pledged, though not publicly, not to press the Jewish state to give up its nuclear weapons as long as it continued to face existential threats in the region. While everyone on the world who has even a slight interest in the subject is aware of the truth, the U.S. government has enacted a regulation—described in the U.S. Energy Department's Classification Bulletin WPN-136 on Foreign Nuclear Capabilities—that threatens government employees with severe punishment if they acknowledge Israel has nuclear weapons. It has also been suggested that the U.S. invasion of Iraq in 2003 had little to do with the destruction of Iraqi weapons of mass destruction, as officially claimed, but was instead meant to realize the PNAC goal of establishing a permanent U.S. military presence in the region and installing a puppet state in Iraq.

War on terror 
Daryl Glaser suggests that the U.S. war on terrorism has been undermined by its support of the Israeli government, pro-western Arab dictatorships, and authoritarian Islamist groups while invading designated "rogue" states such as Iraq and Afghanistan. Glaser explains the American policies have robbed Arab and Muslim countries of the moral authority they require to effectively combat terrorism. These administrations are unable to explain to their citizens why legitimate grievances (particularly against Israel) should be stifled while the West promotes state and opposition terrorism of its own. Furthermore, Glaser continues, because American policies inflame Arab and Muslim rage, new terrorist groups may emerge from their ranks.

Francis Boyle suggests that the first step towards addressing the terrorism problems created by international terrorist actions directed against American interests around the world, is to implement the Palestinian people's internationally-recognized legal right to self-determination and a state of their own.
When Abu Nidal organization took sole responsibility for the Rome and Vienna bombings, President Reagan asserted that "these murderers could not carry out their crimes without the sanctuary and support provided by regimes such as Colonel Qaddafi’s in Libya." Reagan then suspended all commercial transactions between the U.S. and Libya and recalled all Americans living or working in Libya. Boyle, however, notes that U.S. oil companies in Libya were exempted from these Reagan's orders.

See also
 Hypocrisy
 Political integrity
 Double standard
 Human Rights Record of the U.S.
 Criticism of U.S. foreign policy
 Unethical human experimentation in the U.S.

References

Sources
 
 
 
 
 
 

Human rights in the United States
United States foreign policy
Criticism of the United States